Fedor Ivanovich Bylinkin was an aircraft designer and builder in Russia before World War I.  He designed and built a monoplane in 1910 similar to the Antoinette VI which succeeded in reaching 200 m of flight.  A later biplane design proved a failure.

Bylinkin had earlier joined with Igor Sikorsky to design a biplane featuring a 15 hp Anzani engine in pusher configuration.  This design was later rebuilt to address a lack of power, installing a 25 hp Anzani in a tractor configuration.  This design, dubbed the BIS-2, was flown for the first time by Sikorsky on 3 June 1910.  Maximum distance achieved by this design was 600 m and maximum flight time was 42 seconds.

References 

 

Aircraft manufacturers of Russia